Motor racing describes various forms of motor-powered racing:

Auto racing
Motorboat racing
Motorcycle racing
Kart racing
Truck racing

Motor racing may also refer to:

Motor Racing Developments
Motor Racing Network
Motor Racing Outreach